Admiral Sir Manley Laurence Power KCB, CBE, DSO & Bar, DL (10 January 1904 – 17 May 1981) was a Royal Navy Admiral who fought in World War II as a Captain and later rose to more senior ranks, including the NATO position Allied Commander-in-Chief, Channel. One of his chief accomplishments was leading the 26th Destroyer Flotilla into the Malacca Strait during Operation Dukedom to sink the Japanese cruiser Haguro.

Early career
Born the son of Admiral Sir Laurence E. Power KCB, CVO, Power was educated at the Royal Naval Colleges at Osborne and Dartmouth, becoming a Royal Navy officer cadet in 1917. In the early part of his career, he served mainly in submarines, attaining his first command in 1933.

World War II
In 1939 he was promoted to Commander and appointed as Staff Officer (Operations) to the Commander-in-Chief, Mediterranean, Vice-Admiral Sir Andrew Cunningham.

He was promoted to Captain in 1943, and Deputy Chief of Staff (Plans), and stayed in the Mediterranean until March 1944, planning the invasion of Italy and the Anzio landings.

Power became captain of the 26th Destroyer Flotilla in April 1944, taking part in the Normandy landings, and as captain of the destroyer  participated in an action to destroy an enemy convoy off the Norwegian coast in November 1944. He was then appointed to command  in the Eastern Fleet, and his flotilla destroyed the Japanese cruiser Haguro in May 1945.

Post-war
Following the war, Power served as Deputy Director of Plans in the Admiralty between January and July 1946, then as Senior Naval Member of the Directing Staff at the Joint Services Staff College, later becoming commander of the Portland (Dorset) naval base. Following this he served as Flag Captain to the Commander-in-Chief, Home Fleet (Admiral Sir Philip Vian), then in May 1952 as Chief of Staff to the Commander-in-Chief Mediterranean (Admiral 1st Lord Mountbatten of Burma). He was promoted to rear-admiral in 1953, and in the following year was appointed Senior Naval Member of the Directing Staff of the Imperial Defence College. Promoted to vice-admiral, he became Flag Officer, Aircraft Carriers in 1956 and Deputy Chief of the Naval Staff and Fifth Sea Lord in 1957. Promoted to admiral in 1960, his final appointments were as Commander-in-Chief, Portsmouth and Allied Commander-in-Chief, Channel in 1959 before retiring in 1961.

Family
He married Barbara Alice Mary Topham in 1930 and the couple had a daughter and a son.

Honours and decorations

References

External links
The Memoirs of Admiral Sir Manley Power held at Churchill Archive Centre

|-

1904 births
1981 deaths
People educated at the Royal Naval College, Osborne
Graduates of Britannia Royal Naval College
Royal Navy admirals
Royal Navy officers of World War II
Knights Commander of the Order of the Bath
Commanders of the Order of the British Empire
Recipients of the Croix de Guerre (France)
Officers of the Legion of Merit
Deputy Lieutenants of Hampshire
Deputy Lieutenants of the Isle of Wight
Companions of the Distinguished Service Order
Lords of the Admiralty
People from Kingston upon Thames
Military personnel from Surrey